Battle Flame is a 1959 American war film directed by R. G. Springsteen and written by Elwood Ullman. The film stars Scott Brady, Elaine Edwards, Robert Blake, Wayne Heffley, Gordon Jones and Ken Miller. The film was released on July 26, 1959, by Allied Artists Pictures.

Cast           
Scott Brady as 1st Lt. Frank Davis
Elaine Edwards as Lt. Mary Ferguson
Robert Blake as Cpl. Jake Pacheco
Wayne Heffley as Teach
Gordon Jones as Sgt. McKelvey
Ken Miller as Orlando
Arthur Walsh as Nawlins
Richard Harrison as 2nd Lt. Wechsler
Gary Kent as Gilcrist
Peggy Moffitt as Nurse Fisher
Jean Robbins as Nurse Claycomb
Richard Crane as Dr. Bill Stoddard
Robert Shayne as Lt. Norris
Guy Prescott as Lt. Col. Struthers
Robert Christopher as Capt. Herndon
John Mitchum as Maj. Dowling

References

External links
 

1959 films
American war films
1959 war films
Allied Artists films
Films directed by R. G. Springsteen
Korean War films
1950s English-language films
1950s American films